Charles T. Jones (July 1888 – after 1909) was an English footballer who played in the Football League for Birmingham.

Jones was born in the Moseley district of Birmingham. An outside left, described as "speedy but not particularly accurate with his crosses", he began his football career with his works team before joining Birmingham in 1908. He made his debut, which was also his only appearance, in the Football League Second Division on 30 January 1909 in a 1–1 draw at Burnley. Later that year he joined Bristol Rovers of the Southern League, for whom he appeared occasionally as deputy for Billy Peplow.

References

1888 births
Year of death missing
Footballers from Birmingham, West Midlands
English footballers
Association football wingers
Birmingham City F.C. players
Bristol Rovers F.C. players
English Football League players
Place of death missing